Albion Mills may refer to:

Albion Mills, Southwark, London
Albion Mill, Ancoats, Manchester
Albion Mills Retail Park, Wakefield
Nelstrops Albion Flour Mills, also known as Albion Mills, Stockport
Mills mentioned in William Blake's poem And did those feet in ancient time